The 1977–78 Phoenix Suns season was the tenth season for the Phoenix Suns of the National Basketball Association. The team finished second in a Pacific division that did not have a team finish below .500, as the Suns returned to the playoffs for the third time in franchise history. The Suns were led by head coach John MacLeod and played all home games in Arizona Veterans Memorial Coliseum.

Both Paul Westphal and Walter Davis, a rookie from the University of North Carolina, were selected to participate in the All-Star Game and by the end of the season, both were members of the All-NBA Second Team. Davis became the second Sun in three years to be selected as Rookie of the Year, an award teammate Alvan Adams had collected after the 1975–76 season.

Both Westphal and rookie Davis averaged career-highs in scoring, averaging 25.2 and 24.2 points a game. The combined averaged of 49.4 points made for the league's highest-scoring duo on the season. Additionally, Westphal and Davis broke a franchise record of 45.9 points a game, a mark set by Connie Hawkins and Dick Van Arsdale during the 1969–70 season.

Offseason

NBA Draft

The Suns used their first-round pick to select swingman Walter Davis from North Carolina. Davis averaged 15.7 points, 5.6 rebounds and 3.4 assists per game in four years with the Tar Heels. He would make an immediate impact with the Suns, helping the team make a 15-game improvement and return to the playoffs. Averaging 24.2 points, 6.0 rebounds and 3.4 assists per game his first season, Davis was named Rookie of the Year, receiving 49 1/4 of 66 votes. He would also be named to the All-NBA Second Team, and would finish fifth in Most Valuable Player voting, behind winner Bill Walton, George Gervin, David Thompson and Kareem Abdul-Jabbar. Davis spent his first eleven seasons with the Suns before joining the Denver Nuggets as the league's second unrestricted free agent in 1988. He left as the Suns' all-time leading scorer (15,666 points), and had his #6 jersey retired by the franchise in 1994.

Roster
{| class="toccolours" style="font-size: 85%; width: 100%;"
|-
! colspan="2" style="background-color: #423189;  color: #FF8800; text-align: center;" | Phoenix Suns roster
|- style="background-color: #FF8800; color: #423189;   text-align: center;"
! Players !! Coaches
|-
| valign="top" |
{| class="sortable" style="background:transparent; margin:0px; width:100%;"
! Pos. !! # !! Nat. !! Name !! Height !! Weight !! DOB (Y-M-D) !! From
|-

Regular season

Standings

Record vs. opponents

Game log

!!Streak
|-
|- align="center" bgcolor="#ccffcc"
| 1
| October 18
| Golden State
| W 100–83
| Alvan Adams (27)
| Arizona Veterans Memorial Coliseum9,128
| 1–0
| W 1
|- align="center" bgcolor="#ccffcc"
| 2
| October 23
| @ Los Angeles
| W 104–101
| Paul Westphal (26)
| The Forum10,481
| 2–0
| W 2
|- align="center" bgcolor="#ccffcc"
| 3
| October 25
| Seattle
| W 93–86
| Paul Westphal (30)
| Arizona Veterans Memorial Coliseum10,917
| 3–0
| W 3
|- align="center" bgcolor="#ffcccc"
| 4
| October 28
| @ New Orleans
| L 107–114
| Paul Westphal (23)
| Louisiana Superdome10,342
| 3–1
| L 1
|- align="center" bgcolor="#ffcccc"
| 5
| October 29
| @ Houston
| L 112–125
| Paul Westphal (28)
| The Summit8,557
| 3–2
| L 2
|- align="center" bgcolor="#ffcccc"
| 6
| October 31
| San Antonio
| L 143–145
| Paul Westphal (37)
| Arizona Veterans Memorial Coliseum10,030
| 3–3
| L 3
|-
!!Streak
|-
|- align="center" bgcolor="#ccffcc"
| 7
| November 3
| @ San Antonio
| W 110–89
| Walter Davis (24)
| HemisFair Arena8,394
| 4–3
| W 1
|- align="center" bgcolor="#ffcccc"
| 8
| November 4
| @ Washington
| L 96–113
| Ron Lee (21)
| Capital Centre8,742
| 4–4
| L 1
|- align="center" bgcolor="#ffcccc"
| 9
| November 5
| @ Chicago
| L 94–111
| Walter Davis (25)
| Chicago Stadium13,424
| 4–5
| L 2
|- align="center" bgcolor="#ccffcc"
| 10
| November 10
| New Orleans
| W 127–111
| Alvan Adams (35)
| Arizona Veterans Memorial Coliseum10,297
| 5–5
| W 1
|- align="center" bgcolor="#ccffcc"
| 11
| November 13
| Indiana
| W 116–107
| Ron Lee (24)
| Arizona Veterans Memorial Coliseum12,550
| 6–5
| W 2
|- align="center" bgcolor="#ccffcc"
| 12
| November 18
| Chicago
| W 103–101
| Walter Davis,Paul Westphal (25)
| Arizona Veterans Memorial Coliseum12,543
| 7–5
| W 3
|- align="center" bgcolor="#ccffcc"
| 13
| November 20
| San Antonio
| W 134–112
| Alvan Adams (32)
| Arizona Veterans Memorial Coliseum9,677
| 8–5
| W 4
|- align="center" bgcolor="#ccffcc"
| 14
| November 22
| Los Angeles
| W 118–107
| Walter Davis (34)
| Arizona Veterans Memorial Coliseum10,130
| 9–5
| W 5
|- align="center" bgcolor="#ffcccc"
| 15
| November 24
| @ Cleveland
| L 82–97
| Paul Westphal (22)
| Coliseum at Richfield15,445
| 9–6
| L 1
|- align="center" bgcolor="#ccffcc"
| 16
| November 25
| @ Indiana
| W 118–110
| Alvan Adams,Paul Westphal (30)
| Market Square Arena15,448
| 10–6
| W 1
|- align="center" bgcolor="#ccffcc"
| 17
| November 27
| Denver
| W 115–97
| Paul Westphal (48)
| Arizona Veterans Memorial Coliseum10,658
| 11–6
| W 2
|- align="center" bgcolor="#ffcccc"
| 18
| November 29
| @ Portland
| L 96–108
| Walter Davis,Paul Westphal (25)
| Memorial Coliseum12,666
| 11–7
| L 1
|-
!!Streak
|-
|- align="center" bgcolor="#ffcccc"
| 19
| December 2
| Portland
| L 103–106
| Paul Westphal (32)
| Arizona Veterans Memorial Coliseum12,660
| 11–8
| L 2
|- align="center" bgcolor="#ffcccc"
| 20
| December 4
| Atlanta
| L 89–96
| Alvan Adams (18)
| Arizona Veterans Memorial Coliseum9,577
| 11–9
| L 3
|- align="center" bgcolor="#ccffcc"
| 21
| December 6
| @ Kansas City
| W 103–92
| Walter Davis (29)
| Kemper Arena5,976
| 12–9
| W 1
|- align="center" bgcolor="#ccffcc"
| 22
| December 7
| @ Detroit
| W 113–107 (OT)
| Walter Davis,Paul Westphal (27)
| Cobo Arena3,588
| 13–9
| W 2
|- align="center" bgcolor="#ccffcc"
| 23
| December 10
| Houston
| W 110–93
| Walter Davis (29)
| Arizona Veterans Memorial Coliseum8,761
| 14–9
| W 3
|- align="center" bgcolor="#ccffcc"
| 24
| December 14
| Buffalo
| W 113–103
| Paul Westphal (29)
| Arizona Veterans Memorial Coliseum10,597
| 15–9
| W 4
|- align="center" bgcolor="#ccffcc"
| 25
| December 16
| @ New Orleans
| W 126–113
| Walter Davis (24)
| Louisiana Superdome8,172
| 16–9
| W 5
|- align="center" bgcolor="#ccffcc"
| 26
| December 17
| @ Houston
| W 101–97
| Paul Westphal (26)
| The Summit8,134
| 17–9
| W 6
|- align="center" bgcolor="#ffcccc"
| 27
| December 18
| @ Atlanta
| L 129–134 (2OT)
| Walter Davis (33)
| Omni Coliseum8,062
| 17–10
| L 1
|- align="center" bgcolor="#ccffcc"
| 28
| December 20
| @ New York
| W 110–99
| Paul Westphal (32)
| Madison Square Garden13,548
| 18–10
| W 1
|- align="center" bgcolor="#ffcccc"
| 29
| December 21
| @ Philadelphia
| L 119–125
| Walter Davis (35)
| The Spectrum14,671
| 18–11
| L 1
|- align="center" bgcolor="#ccffcc"
| 30
| December 23
| Boston
| W 129–110
| Paul Westphal (19)
| Arizona Veterans Memorial Coliseum12,660
| 19–11
| W 1
|- align="center" bgcolor="#ffcccc"
| 31
| December 26
| @ Denver
| L 108–127
| Walter Davis (23)
| McNichols Sports Arena17,297
| 19–12
| L 1
|- align="center" bgcolor="#ccffcc"
| 32
| December 27
| Seattle
| W 131–105
| Ron Lee (30)
| Arizona Veterans Memorial Coliseum12,543
| 20–12
| W 1
|- align="center" bgcolor="#ccffcc"
| 33
| December 29
| Kansas City
| W 110–104
| Walter Davis,Paul Westphal (33)
| Arizona Veterans Memorial Coliseum12,660
| 21–12
| W 1
|- align="center" bgcolor="#ffcccc"
| 34
| December 30
| @ Seattle
| L 110–121
| Paul Westphal (32)
| Seattle Center Coliseum14,098
| 21–13
| L 1
|-
!!Streak
|-
|- align="center" bgcolor="#ccffcc"
| 35
| January 3
| @ Milwaukee
| W 125–103
| Paul Westphal (34)
| MECCA Arena8,571
| 22–13
| W 1
|- align="center" bgcolor="#ffcccc"
| 36
| January 4
| @ New Jersey
| L 83–115
| Paul Westphal (21)
| Rutgers Athletic Center4,067
| 22–14
| L 1
|- align="center" bgcolor="#ccffcc"
| 37
| January 5
| @ Boston
| W 121–111
| Paul Westphal (43)
| Hartford Civic Center10,019
| 23–14
| W 1
|- align="center" bgcolor="#ccffcc"
| 38
| January 7
| @ Buffalo
| W 107–97
| Paul Westphal (29)
| Buffalo Memorial Auditorium7,029
| 24–14
| W 2
|- align="center" bgcolor="#ccffcc"
| 39
| January 11
| New Orleans
| W 142–99
| Walter Davis (24)
| Arizona Veterans Memorial Coliseum12,660
| 25–14
| W 3
|- align="center" bgcolor="#ccffcc"
| 40
| January 13
| Detroit
| W 111–100
| Paul Westphal (26)
| Arizona Veterans Memorial Coliseum12,660
| 26–14
| W 4
|- align="center" bgcolor="#ccffcc"
| 41
| January 15
| Cleveland
| W 113–104
| Walter Davis (31)
| Arizona Veterans Memorial Coliseum11,787
| 27–14
| W 5
|- align="center" bgcolor="#ccffcc"
| 42
| January 19
| New York
| W 134–114
| Paul Westphal (31)
| Arizona Veterans Memorial Coliseum10,935
| 28–14
| W 6
|- align="center" bgcolor="#ffcccc"
| 43
| January 20
| @ Golden State
| L 104–119
| Walter Davis (31)
| Oakland–Alameda County Coliseum Arena13,237
| 28–15
| L 1
|- align="center" bgcolor="#ccffcc"
| 44
| January 22
| Washington
| W 114–101
| Paul Westphal (30)
| Arizona Veterans Memorial Coliseum12,660
| 29–15
| W 1
|- align="center" bgcolor="#ccffcc"
| 45
| January 25
| Houston
| W 118–96
| Paul Westphal (25)
| Arizona Veterans Memorial Coliseum9,277
| 30–15
| W 2
|- align="center" bgcolor="#ccffcc"
| 46
| January 27
| Philadelphia
| W 110–101
| Walter Davis (29)
| Arizona Veterans Memorial Coliseum12,660
| 31–15
| W 3
|- align="center" bgcolor="#ccffcc"
| 47
| January 29
| New Jersey
| W 131–100
| Bayard Forrest (23)
| Arizona Veterans Memorial Coliseum10,327
| 32–15
| W 4
|- align="center" bgcolor="#ccffcc"
| 48
| January 31
| @ Kansas City
| W 112–102
| Walter Davis (21)
| Omaha Civic Auditorium5,182
| 33–15
| W 5
|-
!!Streak
|-
|- align="center" bgcolor="#ffcccc"
| 49
| February 1
| @ Detroit
| L 120–127
| Walter Davis (26)
| Cobo Arena5,143
| 33–16
| L 1
|- align="center" bgcolor="#ccffcc"
| 50
| February 3
| Milwaukee
| W 115–105
| Walter Davis (30)
| Arizona Veterans Memorial Coliseum12,660
| 34–16
| W 1
|- align="center" bgcolor="#ccffcc"
| 51
| February 9
| Atlanta
| W 125–98
| Walter Davis (28)
| Arizona Veterans Memorial Coliseum9,877
| 35–16
| W 2
|- align="center" bgcolor="#ccffcc"
| 52
| February 12
| Washington
| W 121–109
| Paul Westphal (43)
| Arizona Veterans Memorial Coliseum12,467
| 36–16
| W 3
|- align="center" bgcolor="#ffcccc"
| 53
| February 14
| @ Portland
| L 100–113
| Walter Davis (39)
| Memorial Coliseum12,666
| 36–17
| L 1
|- align="center" bgcolor="#ffcccc"
| 54
| February 16
| Boston
| L 95–98
| Walter Davis (27)
| Arizona Veterans Memorial Coliseum12,660
| 36–18
| L 2
|- align="center" bgcolor="#ffcccc"
| 55
| February 17
| @ Golden State
| L 92–111
| Alvan Adams,Walter Davis (16)
| Oakland–Alameda County Coliseum Arena13,185
| 36–19
| L 3
|- align="center" bgcolor="#ccffcc"
| 56
| February 18
| Indiana
| W 114–101
| Paul Westphal (26)
| Arizona Veterans Memorial Coliseum12,660
| 37–19
| W 1
|- align="center" bgcolor="#ccffcc"
| 57
| February 21
| @ Buffalo
| W 114–111
| Walter Davis (32)
| Buffalo Memorial Auditorium4,409
| 38–19
| W 2
|- align="center" bgcolor="#ffcccc"
| 58
| February 22
| @ Atlanta
| L 95–107
| Paul Westphal (37)
| Charlotte Coliseum5,843
| 38–20
| L 1
|- align="center" bgcolor="#ffcccc"
| 59
| February 24
| @ Washington
| L 120–121 (OT)
| Paul Westphal (35)
| Capital Centre12,432
| 38–21
| L 2
|- align="center" bgcolor="#ffcccc"
| 60
| February 25
| @ New York
| L 115–122
| Paul Westphal (27)
| Madison Square Garden17,197
| 38–22
| L 3
|- align="center" bgcolor="#ffcccc"
| 61
| February 28
| @ Chicago
| L 115–126
| Walter Davis (36)
| Chicago Stadium14,713
| 38–23
| L 4
|-
!!Streak
|-
|- align="center" bgcolor="#ffcccc"
| 62
| March 1
| Detroit
| L 102–115
| Paul Westphal (240
| Arizona Veterans Memorial Coliseum10,161
| 38–24
| L 5
|- align="center" bgcolor="#ccffcc"
| 63
| March 3
| Milwaukee
| W 132–126
| Paul Westphal (31)
| Arizona Veterans Memorial Coliseum11,139
| 39–24
| W 1
|- align="center" bgcolor="#ffcccc"
| 64
| March 5
| Philadelphia
| L 92–104
| Walter Davis (25)
| Arizona Veterans Memorial Coliseum12,145
| 39–25
| L 1
|- align="center" bgcolor="#ccffcc"
| 65
| March 7
| @ Denver
| W 126–112
| Walter Davis (34)
| McNichols Sports Arena17,428
| 40–25
| W 1
|- align="center" bgcolor="#ccffcc"
| 66
| March 9
| Chicago
| W 112–103
| Paul Westphal (34)
| Arizona Veterans Memorial Coliseum11,748
| 41–25
| W 2
|- align="center" bgcolor="#ccffcc"
| 67
| March 11
| Los Angeles
| W 120–114
| Walter Davis (34)
| Arizona Veterans Memorial Coliseum12,660
| 42–25
| W 3
|- align="center" bgcolor="#ffcccc"
| 68
| March 12
| @ Los Angeles
| L 112–128
| Paul Westphal (29)
| The Forum17,505
| 42–26
| L 1
|- align="center" bgcolor="#ffcccc"
| 69
| March 14
| @ Milwaukee
| L 106–121
| Walter Davis (38)
| MECCA Arena10,938
| 42–27
| L 2
|- align="center" bgcolor="#ffcccc"
| 70
| March 15
| @ New Jersey
| L 98–117
| Alvan Adams (21)
| Rutgers Athletic Center4,260
| 42–28
| L 3
|- align="center" bgcolor="#ffcccc"
| 71
| March 17
| @ Boston
| L 108–115
| Paul Westphal (24)
| Boston Garden15,276
| 42–29
| L 4
|- align="center" bgcolor="#ccffcc"
| 72
| March 19
| @ Cleveland
| W 123–112
| Paul Westphal (39)
| Coliseum at Richfield15,622
| 43–29
| W 1
|- align="center" bgcolor="#ffcccc"
| 73
| March 21
| @ Indiana
| L 115–119
| Walter Davis (27)
| Market Square Arena10,633
| 43–30
| L 1
|- align="center" bgcolor="#ccffcc"
| 74
| March 23
| New York
| W 120–108
| Walter Davis (29)
| Arizona Veterans Memorial Coliseum12,660
| 44–30
| W 1
|- align="center" bgcolor="#ccffcc"
| 75
| March 25
| Buffalo
| W 112–106
| Alvan Adams (27)
| Arizona Veterans Memorial Coliseum11,642
| 45–30
| W 2
|- align="center" bgcolor="#ccffcc"
| 76
| March 29
| Portland
| W 127–94
| Paul Westphal (33)
| Arizona Veterans Memorial Coliseum12,660
| 46–30
| W 3
|- align="center" bgcolor="#ccffcc"
| 77
| March 31
| Kansas City
| W 136–112
| Paul Westphal (35)
| Arizona Veterans Memorial Coliseum10,590
| 47–30
| W 4
|-
!!Streak
|-
|- align="center" bgcolor="#ccffcc"
| 78
| April 2
| Golden State
| W 105–99
| Paul Westphal (27)
| Arizona Veterans Memorial Coliseum11,040
| 48–30
| W 5
|- align="center" bgcolor="#ffcccc"
| 79
| April 4
| @ San Antonio
| L 119–125
| Walter Davis (35)
| HemisFair Arena9,112
| 48–31
| L 1
|- align="center" bgcolor="#ffcccc"
| 80
| April 6
| Denver
| L 105–111
| Walter Davis (29)
| Arizona Veterans Memorial Coliseum12,660
| 48–32
| L 2
|- align="center" bgcolor="#ffcccc"
| 81
| April 7
| @ Seattle
| L 83–95
| Paul Westphal (16)
| Seattle Center Coliseum14,098
| 48–33
| L 3
|- align="center" bgcolor="#ccffcc"
| 82
| April 8
| New Jersey
| W 120–109
| Paul Westphal (26)
| Arizona Veterans Memorial Coliseum12,226
| 49–33
| W 1
|-

Playoffs

Game log

|- align="center" bgcolor="#ffcccc"
| 1
| April 11
| Milwaukee
| L 103–111
| Walter Davis (31)
| Alvan Adams (9)
| Paul Westphal (9)
| Arizona Veterans Memorial Coliseum12,161
| 0–1
|- align="center" bgcolor="#ffcccc"
| 2
| April 14
| @ Milwaukee
| L 90–94
| Paul Westphal (32)
| Walter Davis (9)
| Paul Westphal (10)
| MECCA Arena10,938
| 0–2
|-

Awards and honors

All-Star
 Paul Westphal was voted as a starter for the Western Conference in the All-Star Game. It was his second consecutive All-Star selection. Westphal finished second in voting among Western Conference guards with 264,006 votes.
 Walter Davis was selected as a reserve for the Western Conference in the All-Star Game. It was his first All-Star selection.

Season
 Walter Davis received the Rookie of the Year Award.
 Paul Westphal was named to the All-NBA Second Team. Westphal also finished sixth in MVP voting.
 Walter Davis was named to the All-NBA Second Team. Davis also finished fifth in MVP voting.
 Don Buse was named to the NBA All-Defensive First Team.
 Walter Davis was named to the NBA All-Rookie First Team.
 Ron Lee led the league in steals per game with a 2.74 average, and total steals with 225.

Player statistics

Season

Playoffs

Transactions

Trades

Free agents

Additions

Subtractions

References

Phoenix Suns seasons
Phoenix